Calbraith is both a surname and a given name. Notable people with the name include:

Clare Calbraith, English actress
Arthur Calbraith Dorrance
Calbraith Perry Rodgers, American aviator
Matthew Calbraith Perry
Matthew Calbraith Butler, American military commander